The Silent World of Doctor and Patient is an influential book on medical ethics written by Jay Katz and published by The Free Press in 1984.

References

Ethics books
Medical ethics
1984 non-fiction books